Donald Cowart (born 24 October 1985) is an American steeplechase runner.

At the 2011 Pan American Games and the 2015 Pan American Games he placed fourth.

External links 

 

1985 births
Living people
American male steeplechase runners
Pan American Games track and field athletes for the United States
Athletes (track and field) at the 2011 Pan American Games
Athletes (track and field) at the 2015 Pan American Games
Place of birth missing (living people)